Mangifera bullata is a species of plant in the family Anacardiaceae. It is found in Indonesia and possibly Malaysia.

References

bullata
Data deficient plants
Taxonomy articles created by Polbot
Taxa named by André Joseph Guillaume Henri Kostermans